Bujold may refer to:

Edèse J. Bujold, Canadian politician
Geneviève Bujold, Canadian actress
Guy Bujold, former president of the Canadian Space Agency
Lois McMaster Bujold, American science fiction and fantasy author
Mandy Bujold, Canadian boxer
Rémi Bujold, former Canadian politician